"Why, Pt. 2" is a song by the American band Collective Soul, released on their 2000 album Blender.

Written by singer/guitarist Ed Roland, the song did not chart on the U.S. Billboard Hot 100 charts, but did reach #2 on the Mainstream Rock Tracks chart.

Track listing
All songs written by Ed Roland.

"Why, Pt. 2"
"Over Tokyo" (acoustic demo)
"Why, Pt. 2" (acoustic demo)

External links

References

2000 singles
2000 songs
Atlantic Records singles
Collective Soul songs
Music videos directed by Marcos Siega
Songs written by Ed Roland